The 1976 Calgary Stampeders finished in 5th place in the Western Conference with a 2–12–2 record and failed to make the playoffs.

Regular season

Season Standings

Season schedule

Awards and records

1976 CFL All-Stars
DE – John Helton, CFL All-Star

References

Calgary Stampeders seasons
1976 Canadian Football League season by team